Alex Metzger is a former association football player who represented New Zealand at international level.

Metzger attended Lynfield College in Auckland. He made his full All Whites debut in a 6–0 win over Fiji on 29 June 1979  and ended his international playing career with 10 A-international caps and 1 goal to his credit, becoming the first and only All White to score against Sudan. His final cap was an appearance in a 0–1 loss to Bahrain on 4 April 1984.

References

Year of birth missing (living people)
Living people
Manurewa AFC players
Papatoetoe AFC players
New Zealand association footballers
New Zealand international footballers
Association footballers not categorized by position
People educated at Lynfield College